Busam is a Grassfields language of Cameroon.

References

Southwest Grassfields languages
Languages of Cameroon